Patrick O'Sullivan (born 1985) is an American ice hockey player.

Patrick O'Sullivan may also refer to:
Patrick O'Sullivan (author), Irish author and railway historian from Cahersiveen
Patrick O'Sullivan (businessman) (born 1949), Irish businessman, chairman of Old Mutual
Patrick O'Sullivan (lawyer) (1835–1887), British lawyer
Patrick O'Sullivan (Queensland politician) (1818–1904), Legislative Assembly of Queensland member from Ipswich, 1860–1863
Patrick B. O'Sullivan (1887–1978), U.S. Representative from Connecticut
Patrick O'Sullivan, actor who portrayed Chris in The Cavanaughs web series

See also
Pádraig O'Sullivan, Irish Fianna Fáil politician
Pat O'Sullivan (born 1926), American golfer
Pat Sullivan (disambiguation)